Caroline Marie "Carrie" Bradshaw, (later Caroline Marie "Carrie" Bradshaw Preston) is a fictional character from the HBO franchise Sex and the City, portrayed by Sarah Jessica Parker. Candace Bushnell created Carrie as a semi-autobiographical character for her column "Sex in the City" in The New York Observer. This column was later compiled into the book Sex and the City, and adapted into the television series in turn. Parker reprised the role in the films Sex and the City and Sex and the City 2, and the HBO Max series And Just Like That... Bushnell also authored the young adult novels The Carrie Diaries and Summer and the City featuring the character. The Carrie Diaries was adapted into a CW prequel series of the same name, with Carrie portrayed by AnnaSophia Robb.

In the SATC television series, Carrie is a columnist and fashionista based in New York City; her weekly column, "Sex and the City," provides the narration for each episode. When the series premiered, the character was praised by critics as a positive example of an independent woman in the vein of Mary Richards. However, retrospective analysis tends to place more emphasis on the character's repeated and often unrepentant infidelities, with many critics instead viewing her as narcissistic.

Creation and newspaper column 
Candace Bushnell created Carrie (who had no last name until the television series) as a semi-autobiographical character for her column "Sex and the City" in The New York Observer so her parents would not be aware that they were reading about her sex life. Carrie was introduced as Bushnell's friend, "a journalist in her mid-30’s", and was conceived around the lifestyle of "balancing small paychecks with access to glamour and wealth". Bushnell's columns were later compiled into the book Sex and the City. Bushnell worked with television producer Darren Star to adapt the columns for television.

Television

Sex and the City 
Carrie Bradshaw writes a weekly column called "Sex in the City" for a fictional newspaper called The New York Star. The column focuses on Carrie's sexual escapades and those of her close friends, as well as musings about the relationships between men and women, dating, and New York. It provides Carrie with a certain amount of recognition in the city. People who read her column occasionally describe her as their icon. In the third season, her column is optioned for a film produced by Matthew McConaughey. In the fifth season, some of her columns are compiled into a book. At the end of season four, Carrie begins to write freelance articles for Vogue. Although she initially has trouble dealing with Enid (Candice Bergen), her abrasive, demanding editor at Vogue, she does find her feet and ends up befriending her.

Carrie is notoriously led by her emotions. She seeks acceptance (a door key, bathroom cabinet space) from Mr. Big and others (she obsesses over the review her book received from book critic Michiko Kakutani in The New York Times). "Just tell me I'm the one" she urges Mr. Big at the end of Season 1, worried about his refusal to introduce her to his mother. She often behaves in a selfish manner (as seen during her affair) but unless her self-involvement is pointed out by friends, she is apt to blame this on her tendency to get 'Carried Away', a phrase coined by Mr. Big in Season 2. The result is a flawed but relatable character due to the self-deprecating humor with which she tackles stereotypical issues within male–female relationships (commitment being the running theme).

Carrie is an on-off smoker and when she smokes, she is mostly seen with Marlboro Lights. She tries to quit in seasons 3 and 4 using a nicotine patch while dating Aidan. She enjoys cocktails and particularly cosmopolitans. Her character's fondness for them helped to popularize the drink. While Carrie is a realist about the difficulties of relationships, having experienced many bad ones throughout the course of the series, she is a romantic on an endless search for true love, and refuses to settle for, as she puts it, "anything less than butterflies." Because of this, she repeatedly expresses doubts that she is the type to get married and raise a family.

Little is mentioned about Carrie's life before the series. Carrie arrived in Manhattan on Tuesday, June 11, 1986 when she was approximately 21, given her age that is mentioned at other points in the series. She says in the movie that she's lived in Manhattan for 20 years (although she states at age 35 that she had been living there for a decade). In season 4, Carrie tells a photographer that she was so poor when she first moved to New York that she would purchase Vogue instead of dinner. It is mentioned that her father left her and her mother when she was five; no siblings are mentioned. It is also revealed that Carrie had an abortion in 1988 after a one-night stand with a waiter when she was 22.

She tells Charlotte that she lost her virginity in Seth Bateman's smelly rec room on the ping pong table in eleventh grade. In Season 6 ("Boy Interrupted"), Carrie meets up with another boyfriend from high school named Jeremy (David Duchovny). Carrie states that she never had sex with him because they were young and wanted to wait.

The Carrie Diaries 
A TV series was made after the production of Sex and the City, called The Carrie Diaries which featured Carrie's life as a teenager prior to her life in Sex and the City. It focused mainly on Carrie who lived with her father and younger sister, Dorrit. She had a few relationships, the main one being her on-and-off relationship with Sebastian Kydd. She started working at Interview, a magazine firm, juggling between her school and work life. The series was discontinued after Season 2 as it was said that it was not economically feasible although it got positive feedback from its audience.

Candace Bushnell, author of Sex and the City, recently released her new book, Summer and the City: A Carrie Diaries Novel as part of her young adult series that follows the Sex and the City characters as teenagers. This novel reveals that Carrie attended the prestigious Ivy League University, Brown, in the 1980s. It also reveals that she took summer classes at The New School. TV Guide described the young version of Carrie Bradshaw as "Even when she's trying to play adult in the city with her fashion-forward style and 'grown-up' conversations, she still exudes an aura that manages to be innocent, cute and self-confident at the same time."

Wardrobe
Carrie has been described as someone who lives for fashion, and has confessed to buying Vogue instead of dinner.

A known shoe lover with a penchant for expensive designer shoes (notably Manolo Blahniks, but also Christian Louboutins and Jimmy Choos), Miranda once estimated that Carrie has spent over $40,000 on shoes. Her shoes seem to average at least $400 a pair (according to Miranda), and it is implied that she has at least 100 unique pairs. She frequently mixes kitschy vintage finds with high-end labels. It is mentioned that Barneys, Bergdorf Goodman, Bloomingdale's, and Saks Fifth Avenue are among her favorite places to shop.

Carrie once agreed to model for a charity fashion show (featuring both "real people" and models), on the condition that she could keep the outfit, a Dolce and Gabbana original. The plan backfired when Carrie's dress was replaced by jeweled silk underwear. Carrie is also known to have worn Alexander McQueen, Anna Molinari, Balenciaga, Betsey Johnson, Bottega Veneta, Burberry, Céline, Chanel, Chloé, Christian Dior, Christian Lacroix, Christian Louboutin, Diane von Fürstenberg, Fendi, Givenchy, Gucci, Heatherette, Helmut Lang, Hermès, Jean-Paul Gaultier, Jeremy Scott, Judith Leiber, Jil Sander, Jimmy Choo, Louis Vuitton, Lanvin, Manolo Blahnik, Marc Jacobs, Marni, Missoni, Miu Miu, Moschino, Prada, Oscar de la Renta, Roberto Cavalli, Sonia Rykiel, Tom Ford, Yves Saint Laurent, Vera Wang, Valentino, Versace, Vivienne Westwood, among others.

Carrie's incredible wardrobe appears to be unaffordable for a writer on a moderate income (at least until season 5, at which time she is given a book offer. By the time of the films she appears to be more affluent, though that may be because of her husband's wealth). Indeed, many of the people around her comment that she cannot afford her shopping addiction. Carrie occasionally maxes out credit cards, could not secure a loan on her own due to poor savings and a bad credit rating as a result of extensive shopping, and has admitted her "shoe needs" have accounted for most of her spending. In one episode, she wryly comments that she might "literally be the woman who lived in her shoe". Carrie is particularly known for her addiction to shoes, calling it her "substance abuse problem" in the episode "Power of Female Sex" in Season One. Notable couture moments include an incident when she is mugged near West Broadway and the bandit makes off with her Fendi Baguette clutch and Manolo Blahnik pink suede strappy sandals, which she purchased "half off at a sample sale!", adding that they are her favorite shoes. The scene is known for bringing baguette bags into fashion.

In season 3 she chases after the Staten Island ferry and ends up missing it after slipping out of her shoe, yelling, "Wait, I lost my Choo!". In "A Woman's Right To Shoes" she unashamedly asks for reimbursement from a friend after a pair of Manolos are stolen at that friend's party due to her friend's insistence upon no shoes inside the house. Carrie notes the hypocrisy in the fact that the friend, who 'shoe shames' her ("it was your choice to buy shoes that expensive") is rewarded over the years with thousands of dollars' worth of gifts for her life choices (baby showers, engagement presents, wedding gifts, etc.), whereas single women do not have their life choices celebrated ("Hallmark don't make a 'congratulations-you-didn't-marry-the-wrong-guy card'!") and so comes to the conclusion that it is okay to spend that much on oneself to make the single girl's walk through life a little more fun.

Apartment 
Carrie Bradshaw's apartment is a setting frequently used in Sex and the City, the films Sex and the City and Sex and the City 2, and the sequel series And Just Like That. It is a brownstone apartment located in New York City's Upper East Side at the fictional address of 245 E. 73rd Street. She had been living in the apartment since the beginning of the series, and states in And Just Like That... she moved into the apartment at age 29, and had occupied it for 25 years. The apartment first appears in the pilot episode "Sex and the City" with a noticeably different layout; the second episode "Models and Mortals" introduces the layout seen throughout the rest of the series. In the first season a large neon sign for a coffee shop is seen outside the front window, which was dropped in later episodes. The apartment is mentioned as being rent controlled and costing her $750 a month.

In the fourth season, Bradshaw's apartment building becomes a co-op, requiring her to either purchase it or move out. Bradshaw's boyfriend Aiden Shaw purchases it and the adjacent unit, intending to merge them into a larger apartment, but she breaks up with him shortly after. He gives her the opportunity to purchase the apartment from him at cost, but she is unable to afford the down payment until her friend Charlotte York sells her engagement ring and loans her the money.

In the film Sex and the City, Bradshaw sells the apartment after her engagement to Mr. Big to contribute to the purchase of a large penthouse apartment on Fifth Avenue with him. After Big stands her up at their wedding, Bradshaw buys back the apartment and moves back into it. She later gives it an extensive renovation. In Sex and the City 2, following her marriage to Big, Carrie lives in a larger apartment on Fifth Avenue with him but still owns the apartment and periodically uses it as a workspace. 

Bradshaw still owns the apartment as a pied-à-terre in And Just Like That, and has given it another renovation. Following Big's death, she feels uneasiness in the Fifth Avenue apartment they shared, and sells it and moves back into her old apartment. The series also shows the never-before-seen lobby and downstairs apartment in the complex.

Filming 
The interior of Bradshaw's apartment was a set built on a soundstage, while the exterior of the apartment building was shot at various brownstones before settling at 66 Perry Street in the third season, which was used for the remainder of the series due to its ornate staircase. The exterior, sometimes called the "Bradshaw brownstone", is a popular tourist destination in the West Village, which has led to residents complaining about frequent visitors. Owners have hung chains from the stairs to prevent people from posing for photos on the stairs and requested the address be blurred on Google Maps. The apartment has been variously described as a one-bedroom and a studio apartment, though it would be categorized as an "alcove studio" as there is no division between the sleeping area and living room.

The apartment was designed by Sex and the Citys production designer Jeremy Conway. Conway selected the apartment's furnishings to contrast her designer clothing, saying "What she's wearing is where she spends her money, and her apartment is secondary to that. So we started 'flea-ing' and using found pieces she might reupholster."

Relationships

"Mr. Big" John James Preston

Introduced in the first episode and closing the final episode, "Mr. Big" (Chris Noth) is Carrie's central love interest throughout the series and recurring romantic foil – his continual romantic ambiguity and Carrie's diffidence about confronting him over it highlight Carrie's fears, insecurities, and emotional needs. Despite the turmoil in their relationship, Carrie and Big make continuous appearances in each other's lives, which is the source of both joy and stress for Carrie.

"Big" is introduced as a wealthy man who runs into Carrie on the street, helping her pick up a large number of condoms that fell out of her purse after it had been knocked from her hand. He later spots her at a party, and after waving to her at the beginning of the evening, he later gives her a ride home in his limo. Their relationship runs the length of the series. At the start, she is intimidated and awed by him, and immediately gives him the nickname "Mr. Big". However, eventually Carrie and Big share a friendly and often passionate intimacy, yet he remains (in producer Michael Patrick King's words), "always slightly out of reach." Mr. Big's name is never mentioned until the last episode of the final season, where it is revealed to be John via Carrie's cell phone caller ID. His full name is finally uncovered in the first movie as John James Preston.

They break up for the first time due to Mr. Big's inability to be emotionally intimate with Carrie. They reunite but split again when Big announces that he is moving to Paris because of work. When he returns to the United States, he and Carrie bump into each other unexpectedly in the Hamptons. Upon his return, Carrie discovers that he is engaged to a young woman named Natasha, who was working for Ralph Lauren in Paris. Unsurprisingly, Carrie struggles to come to terms with Big's decision and moves on, beginning a relationship with Aidan Shaw. However, Carrie cannot put Big behind her and they have an affair, which she confesses to Aidan moments before Charlotte's wedding. Carrie and Big continue a close, sometimes sexual, always flirtatious yet tempestuous friendship until the final episode. Here we witness a romantic display of love and affection when Big whispers the sorely awaited words to Carrie—"you're the one."

At the start of the movie Sex and the City Carrie and Big, in a businesslike fashion, decide to marry. The wedding starts out somewhat simply with 75 guests and with Carrie choosing to wear a simple white skirt suit that she found in a vintage shop.  However, after Vivenne Westwood gifts an expensive and exquisite wedding dress that Carrie wore in a Vogue modeling shoot featuring Carrie as a "40 year old bride," the wedding plans balloon into something much more elaborate and now with 200 guests. Leading up to their wedding day, Big becomes overwhelmed by the media attention and the number of guests, telling Carrie that he would have been happy with eloping to City Hall, that all he wanted was Carrie and that he's embarrassed by the attention because it's his third marriage.  On the day of the ceremony, Big has a "freakout" and leaves the wedding venue without even getting out of his limousine. When Carrie calls him and asks where he is, he states "I can't do this" and Carrie leaves devastated.  He immediately realizes his mistake and tells the limo driver to turn around but the damage is already done. Carrie, hurt and betrayed, blocks all communication, unknowingly ignoring his love letters and apologetic emails. Over the course of the next 7 or 8 months, Carrie reflects on what happened and realizes that she is partially to blame for the wedding fiasco, because she let the wedding "get bigger than Big."  Finally, Carrie and Big unintentionally meet, come to terms with each other, reaffirm their feelings and love, and privately marry at City Hall - the way Big had originally envisioned - with Carrie wearing the simple "label-less" vintage suit she had initially chosen, along with the blue Manolo Blahniks that had played a big part in the two of them reuniting.

During the second movie, Carrie and Big's passion has waned. Carrie begins to feel that their marriage has lost its "sparkle" as Big enjoys spending nights eating in and watching TV. Carrie feels the urge to escape to her old apartment for two days to meet a writing deadline and enjoy some time to herself, and is surprised when Big picks her up for dinner, and feels the romance re-enter their marriage. Big then suggests to Carrie they spend two days a week apart, to enjoy their own time, which he feels is what is giving their marriage new life. Carrie, somewhat hurt and resistant, reluctantly agrees, and then travels to Abu Dhabi with Samantha, Charlotte and Miranda. While in Abu Dhabi, Carrie learns how important a marriage can be when her butler tells her how he is separated from his wife for months at a time, but when they see each other, nothing else matters. Carrie also reunites with her old flame, Aidan Shaw, whom she meets in a chance encounter at an Abu Dhabi market. Carrie feels distressed due to a bad review of her new book in the New Yorker, and meets Aidan for dinner. The two of them reconnect, and briefly kiss. Carrie immediately regrets it and asks her friends for advice on whether to tell Big. Samantha and Miranda both advise Carrie not to tell Big because it was a minor incident, but Carrie feels too guilty to let it slide and tells Big immediately. Big is hurt, and Carrie worries that Big will go from wanting two days off, to seven days off. Upon Carrie's arrival back in New York, she is upset that Big doesn't pick her up at the airport as originally planned, isn't home and hasn't called. That night, he gets home and Carrie and Big talk about their marriage. Big tells Carrie to stop worrying that they will become a tired, boring old married couple, and they take new wedding vows for each other. Big forgives Carrie and gives her a black diamond ring (to make up for his unromantic marriage proposal - without a ring - 3 years earlier) to really show the world she's off the market. As their marriage grows out of the "terrible twos" Big and Carrie seem very happy and relaxed with each other. Now that they are both making an effort, and due to the ring Big gave her, they have their "sparkle" back.

In And Just Like That..., Carrie and Big are still married. In the premier, while Carrie goes to see the recital of Charlotte's oldest daughter, Big has a heart attack. When Carrie arrives home, she experiences Big take his final breaths and breaks down when he dies. His funeral takes place the following episode.

Aidan Shaw
Manhattan furniture designer Aidan Shaw (John Corbett) is Carrie's next serious boyfriend after the painful break-up with Mr. Big. Aidan is the opposite of Mr. Big, as he is a laid-back, low-key nature lover who is patient, straightforward, and somewhat traditional in his relationship with Carrie. Carrie met him through her friend Stanford Blatch when the two of them visited Aidan's furniture store. They share an uncomplicated, loving relationship, which initially confuses Carrie, as she had become used to the stresses of dating Mr. Big. She begins to feel trapped and cannot shake off Mr. Big's presence in her life. Carrie and Aidan first break up when Carrie confesses, on Charlotte and Trey's wedding day, that she had an affair with Mr. Big.

Later in the series, Carrie and Aidan get back together, move in together, and become engaged. However, the engagement is broken when Carrie discovers she is not ready to marry him, and he is not willing to wait for her. Further hurt is caused when Carrie realizes Aidan only wants to marry her because he still doesn't trust her. Aidan hoped that by marrying Carrie, it would show the world she was his. During the sixth-season premiere, Carrie runs into Aidan on the street. She discovers that he has married a fellow furniture designer, Cathy, and has a son named Tate (played by Sarah Jessica Parker's son). The two agree to meet for coffee; Carrie states in voiceover that "there are some dates you cannot wait to keep, and there are some you both know you will never keep." In the film Sex and the City 2, a chance encounter between Aidan and Carrie in Abu Dhabi is a major plot point. While shopping at a local market with Miranda in Abu Dhabi, Carrie and Aidan encounter each other, they make a plan to catch up over dinner, where Aidan reveals he and Cathy are still married and have two more sons, Wyatt and Homer and in a moment of passion, share a brief kiss. Carrie becomes emotionally distraught over this and confesses the kiss to Big. After taking his time coming to terms with this revelation and understanding Carrie's mistake was because of her domestic crisis of faith, he forgives her.

Jack Berger
Following the end of her relationship with Aidan, Carrie begins to date Jack Berger (Ron Livingston), a novelist with a mixed degree of success. She meets him while discussing her upcoming book at her publisher's (Amy Sedaris) office. That day, Carrie and Berger go for a walk, during which Carrie gets a strawberry milkshake from McDonald's. Berger states to her, "How can anyone order strawberry after the age of eleven?", and Carrie obviously likes his sense of humor. However, when she asks him to be her "Plus One" at her party, he states he has a girlfriend. After an initially rocky start (in which Berger must break ties with his ex-girlfriend, Lauren), they form a rather playful relationship; one that initially seems to make Carrie very happy.

Berger is particularly notable for uttering the line, "He's just not that into you," as a response to Miranda's wondering why a recent date has not called her. The line inspired a book and later a film by Sex and the City writers.

As Carrie's success begins to mount, and particularly after Berger's second novel is not picked up for publication, the relationship deteriorates. Berger feels insecure about Carrie's newfound success as a writer after her book goes international and she begins receiving high-sum royalties. This is made worse by Carrie's thoughtless reaction to his first novel; her initial reaction – that she loves the book – is overshadowed by her simultaneous criticism of a minor detail about a lead character's hair accessory (i.e., that a modern-day New York woman would not wear a "scrunchie" while out and about).

Carrie and Berger fight frequently, culminating in a "break" in their relationship. Berger returns, professing his love for Carrie, and stating that he wishes to try again. However, he ends up leaving later, in the middle of the night, breaking up with Carrie via a Post-it note which reads, "I'm sorry, I can't. Don't hate me." After this hasty departure, Berger is referenced in only one more episode—after Carrie runs into his friends at a bar, she regrets leaving Berger an angry message (through his friends), stating that his break-up method was rude and pathetic.

Aleksandr Petrovsky
Next, Carrie meets and begins a relationship with Aleksandr Petrovsky (rus. Александр Пeтpoвcкий'''; Mikhail Baryshnikov), in the sixth season. He is a rich, successful, and older Russian artist. Carrie enjoys the relationship, but problems arise when she discovers that he already has a daughter in her twenties, and he doesn't want any more children. To ensure this, he has had a vasectomy. Carrie feels forced to choose between a long-term relationship with Petrovsky and the possibility of having children. She wonders if his love will be enough to compensate for the lack of children. She decides to stay in the relationship, despite mounting evidence that he will never be able to fully commit to her emotionally, as he is a very self-involved artist, and even at one point he claims that Carrie is "not his friend", but his lover.

He asks Carrie to leave her job and life in New York and move with him to Paris, where he has a museum show. After some degree of convincing, she accepts, giving up her job, her apartment, and her friends. But she finds herself to be lonely, disappointed, and confused upon her arrival, waiting for hours to meet with him, while he forgets his dates with her. She doesn't speak French well, and Petrovsky often leaves her alone in order to tend to his own career. His ex-wife warns Carrie that the relationship will be all about him. Meanwhile, Carrie has no friends there, but things start to look up when she meets some fans of her book, and she agrees to meet them at a cafe. However, a very anxious and panicking Alex begs her to accompany him to his museum show preview, and she agrees. But once there, he deserts her and seems to forget about her, and she realizes he doesn't need her. She rushes to meet with the fans, but they have left and mangled her book in the wake of her standing them up. In the series finale, after an argument and Alex impulsively slaps her, Carrie leaves him after facing his emotional shortcomings and his inability to give her an appropriate amount of attention. While in the lobby of the hotel trying to secure a room of her own, she runs into Mr. Big, who runs to defend her against Aleksandr. He finally understands that she is "the one" and pursued her to Paris with the encouragement of her friends. Carrie returns with Mr. Big to New York City.

Lovers

Sebastian Kydd
Carrie shares her first kiss with Sebastian Kydd, a rich kid from town, at her swim club when she was 15. He later becomes her boyfriend, and they share an on-and-off relationship throughout the first season of The Carrie Diaries. They broke up due to being incompatible. During the second season of The Carrie Diaries, the two reignite their love for each other. Sebastian leaves to California with his father, but he and Carrie maintain a long distance relationship. When Sebastian returns to Manhattan, moving into Larissa's old apartment, Carrie realizes his interests have changed. Sebastian remains busy with interests in starting a clothing line and it causes problems in the relationship. Sebastian wanted to move to California to pursue his dreams, but Carrie wanted to stay in Manhattan to work for Interview Magazine. Carrie decides to say yes to a full-time job offer at Interview but loses her chances at going to NYU. She is later fired because of a dispute between Larissa, and Andy. Carrie tries to attend NYU, but she is told it is too late. After hearing about Carrie's situation,  Sebastian decides to invite her to go live with him in Malibu where he will work on his clothing business. Carrie agrees to move until she later realizes she belongs in Manhattan. The two say their final goodbyes at Larrisa's wedding.

George Silver

Carrie's second boyfriend. She starts dating George after meeting him at her internship at a law firm. She ends their relationship after he tries to force her to have sex in the back of a car. Throughout the relationship she still has feelings for Sebastian, using George to incite feelings of jealousy in Sebastian.

Adam Weaver
Carrie's third boyfriend, appearing in Season 2 of The Carrie Diaries. Larissa, Carrie's boss, wanted Carrie to get an interview with Weaver for Interview Magazine. Carrie attends a role play of Weaver's piece. When she laughs during the funeral scene she is frowned at by her friend Bennet, but Adam Weaver later finds her after the show and is charmed by her understanding of the scene. Carrie and Weaver become close as Carrie tries to pry information out of him for Interview. She later drops the assignment and they start to date. In The Carrie Diaries, she loses her virginity to him. Carrie and Weaver start to have problems when Weaver begins critiquing her work. They get in a fight that ends their relationship, and Weaver accuses her for having feelings for Sebastian. After they break up over Carrie still being in love with Sebastian, Adam writes an article about Carrie as 'Mystery Girl', in which rude and untrue things are said, although nobody knows that the 'Mystery Girl' is Carrie. At the end of  Season 2, he goes to her senior prom, apologizing for his behavior.

Capote Duncan

According to Candace Bushnell's book, Summer and the City, Capote Duncan was Carrie's classmate in The New School. At the beginning, Carrie hated him because of his arrogance but at the end of the book, it was said that he's the person with whom Carrie lost her virginity. He appears briefly in Pilot of the TV series adaption, played by Jeffrey Nordling.

Bernard Singer
In Summer and the City, Bernard Singer is a famous writer who Carrie has a brief relationship with, only to realise that Bernard doesn't love Carrie and that she loves Capote Duncan.

Bibliography
Books:Sex and the City (a collection of her columns)MEN-hattanA Single LifeLove LettersI Do! Do I?Critical reception

Critical reception to Carrie tended to be positive during the show's run and in the years immediately thereafter. In 2004, Carrie Bradshaw was listed as number 11 on Bravo's 100 Greatest TV Characters. In 2009 The Guardian named Bradshaw as an icon of the decade, stating that "Carrie Bradshaw did as much to shift the culture around certain women's issues as real-life female groundbreakers." In 2010, Carrie Bradshaw was listed as the 2nd in TV Guide's list "25 Greatest TV Characters of All-Time". AOL ranked her the 41st Most Memorable Female TV Character. TV Guide named her the most fashionable TV character. Her relationship with Mr. Big was included in TV Guides list of the best TV couples of all time. Parker received one Emmy Award, three Screen Actors Guild Awards, and four Golden Globe Awards for her performance. Reportedly, she earned from third season on 3.2 million dollars per episode, becoming the highest paid tv actor of all time.

In retrospective analysis of the show, critics have generally reassessed Carrie Bradshaw as an unsympathetic protagonist, despite the show's portrayal of her as a positive figure. In 2013, Glamour magazine called Carrie "the worst" character on the show, saying that "her brattiness and self-absorption eclipsed her redeeming qualities and even her awesome shoes." In a 2010 retrospective about the previous two decades in pop culture, ABC News named Carrie one of the ten worst characters of the past twenty years, calling her a "snippy, self-righteous Manhattan snob" and citing the character's actions in Sex and the City 2 as evidence that she was beyond personal growth or redemption. The New Yorker'', looking back on the show a decade after it went off the air, felt that while the character began as a "happy, curious explorer, out companionably smoking with modellizers," from the second season on she "spun out, becoming anxious, obsessive, and, despite her charm, wildly self-centered."

References

External links
 Official Sex and the City homepage

Sex and the City characters
Fictional reporters
Fictional storytellers
Fictional writers
Fictional socialites
Fictional characters from Manhattan
Television characters introduced in 1998
Fictional characters from Connecticut
Female characters in television